The Khunti Lok Sabha constituency is one of the fourteen Lok Sabha (parliamentary) constituencies in Jharkhand state in eastern India. This constituency is reserved for candidates belonging to scheduled tribes. This constituency covers all of Khunti and Simdega districts and parts of Ranchi and Seraikela Kharsawan districts.

Assembly segments
The Khunti Lok Sabha constituency comprises the following six Vidhan Sabha (legislative assembly) segments, all of which are reserved for scheduled tribes:

Members of Parliament

Election Results

See also
 Khunti district
 Simdega district
 List of Constituencies of the Lok Sabha

Notes

External links
Khunti lok sabha  constituency election 2019 result details

Lok Sabha constituencies in Jharkhand
Khunti district
Simdega district